William Bay may refer to:

 William Bay, Western Australia
 William Bay (Wisconsin legislator), Wisconsin assemblyman and railway union leader
 William Van Ness Bay (1818–1894), U.S. Representative from Missouri